Castelnuovo di Porto is a comune (municipality) in the Metropolitan City of Rome in the Italian region Lazio, located about  north of Rome.

Places of interest

Military architecture 
 Rocca Colonna

Natural areas 
 Veio Regional Park

References

External links
 Genealogical website of the comune
 The church books of Castelnuovo di Porto
 The civil registrations of Castelnuovo di Porto 

Cities and towns in Lazio